Craig Tanner (born March 28, 1974) is an American film director, film producer, and editor.  He is best known for his work as visual effects editor for the film Avatar and as producer and editor of God Sleeps in Rwanda.  Tanner is also the co-founder of Digital Revolution Studios, a 3D production studio.

Early life
Tanner was born in Coronado Island, California and raised in the small town of Roseburg, Oregon.  Tanner was a star athlete in high school, lettering in football, swimming, ski team, and wrestling team.  He was offered a full scholarship to play college football at the Air Force Academy.  Tanner was a starter for the Division I NCAA football program for three seasons, winning the Western Athletic Conference (1995) and playing in the Copper Bowl (1995).

Tanner is a graduate of the Air Force Academy and served in the armed forces for eight years.  During his service, Tanner's passion for making movies was recognized and consequently charged with filming and editing for the United States Air Force.

Career
After his military career, Tanner went on to edit feature films. In Hollywood, he resumed his filmmaking career with Warner Bros. and continued to work in post-production. In 2005, Tanner was nominated for an Oscar and received an Emmy for the documentary God Sleeps in Rwanda.

As visual effects editor on Avatar Tanner assisted in the creation of the complex live-action and motion capture hybrid post-production pipeline for James Cameron.

In 2009, Tanner co-founded Digital Revolution Studios, and began directing and producing 3D content for the emerging 3D home and theatrical market.

By collaborating with other leading experts in 3D research and development, Tanner designed and created 3D cameras and equipment for Digital Revolution Studios' use. He produced, directed and edited multiple award-winning content for small and larger venues, from wildlife and nature clips to commercials to independent feature-length films.

Work

Filmography

Awards and nominations
 In 2005, Tanner received an Emmy and was nominated for an Oscar for his work in God Sleeps in Rwanda.
 In 2011, Tanner received a Lumiere for the "3D Electronic Media" in the Foster the People music video "Don't Stop"
 In 2011, Tanner received an Telly Award for the "Best Use of 3D" in the TV series Bullproof
 In 2012, Tanner received an Telly Award for the "Best 3D Commercial - Army Strong"
 In 2012, Tanner received an Telly Award for the "Best 3D Online Programs - Pocket Destinations"
 In 2012, Tanner received an Telly Award for the "Best 3D Non-Broadcast Production - Humor & Heartache of War"
 In 2012, Tanner received an Telly Award for the "Best 3D Online Music Video - Don't Stop"

References

External links

American Cinema Editors
Living people
People from Roseburg, Oregon
Businesspeople from Oregon
Special effects people
Emmy Award winners
3D imaging
1974 births
Film producers from Oregon